The 1420s decade ran from January 1, 1420, to December 31, 1429.

Significant people

References